Neurath is a surname. Notable people with the surname include:

Alois Neurath (1886–1955),  Sudeten German dissident communist activist 
Carolina Neurath (born 1985), Swedish journalist and writer
Eva Neurath (1908–1999), British publisher
Hans Neurath (1909–2002), founding chairman of the Department of Biochemistry at the University of Washington in Seattle
Konstantin von Neurath (1873–1956), German diplomat, foreign minister of Germany between 1932 and 1938
Marie Neurath (1898–1986), member of the team that developed the Vienna Method of Pictorial Statistics, later renamed Isotype
Olga Hahn-Neurath (1882–1937), Austrian mathematician and philosopher
Otto Neurath (1882–1945), Austrian philosopher of science, sociologist, and political economist
Paul Neurath, creator of computer games
Walter Neurath, British publisher
Wilhelm Neurath, (1840–1901), Austrian political economist

See also
Neurath (Grevenbroich), a town in the Rhein-Kreis Neuss, in North Rhine-Westphalia, Germany
Neurath Power Station, lignite-fired power station at Neurath in Grevenbroich, North Rhine-Westphalia, Germany